Wanessa Camargo's discography includes seven studio albums, 2 live albums, 1 extended play and a DVD. In 2000, she began her career with the single "Love Will Not Leave", which debuted at number one and brought a sound between pop and country pop. In 2004, she released her first live album and DVD titled Transparent – Live, where it sold 200,000 copies and marked the year with the success of the track "Half of Me."

In 2007, she changed her artistic name to only Wanessa, releasing the album Total. The album sold about 100,000 copies and gave the singer her first certified platinum, marking the great success of the single "Abrázame", partnership with Mexican banking Camila. In 2010, the singer released Você não Perde por Esperar, her first fully commercialized EP for digital download music in the form of ticket, which contains four tracks. In 2011, she released her seventh album DNA, completely in English.

Albums

Studio albums

Live albums

Video albums

Extended plays

Singles

Promotional singles

As featured artist

Other appearances

References

Discography
Pop music discographies
Discographies of Brazilian artists
 Discography
Latin music discographies